Wuhandong railway station ,once called Liufang station() is a railway station located in Jiangxia District, Wuhan, Hubei Province, China. The new railway station opened on August 12, 2022. It is served by Line 2 and Line 11 of the Wuhan Metro.

History
Wuhandong railway station was constracted on the former site of Liufang railway station, a Goods station on the Wuchang south ring of Wuhan-Jiujiang railway. 

Construction of the railway station started on July 28, 2015. And at first this new railway station was named Optics valley railway station. It was renamed as Wuhan east railway station on August 31, 2022 according to the Rules of railway station naming.

With only the west part (intercity train) actived, The railway station opened on August 12, 2022.

Wuhan Metro

Wuhandong Railway Station, is a transfer station on Line 2 and Line 11 of Wuhan Metro. It entered revenue service on October 1, 2018. It is located in Jiangxia District and it serves the Wuhandong Railway Station.

Station layout

References

Wuhan Metro stations
Line 2, Wuhan Metro
Line 11, Wuhan Metro